The Internazionali Tennis Val Gardena Südtirol (also known as the Sparkassen ATP Challenger on the ATP Challenger Tour) is a tennis tournament held in Ortisei, Italy since 2000. The event is part of the ATP Challenger Tour and the ITF Women's Circuit and is played on indoor hardcourts. The event was previously a $100,000+H ITF Women's Circuit category from 2008 to 2009.

Past finals

Men's singles

Men's doubles

Women's singles

Women's doubles

References

External links

 
ATP Challenger Tour
ITF Women's World Tennis Tour
Hard court tennis tournaments
Recurring sporting events established in 2000
Tennis tournaments in Italy